Susan Estelle Sloan (born April 5, 1958), later known by her married name Susan Kelsey,  is a former Canadian competitive swimmer.  Sloan won a bronze medal at the 1976 Summer Olympics in Montreal, by swimming the butterfly leg for the third-place Canadian team in the women's 4x100-metre medley relay, together with teammates Wendy Hogg (backstroke), Robin Corsiglia (breaststroke), and Anne Jardin (freestyle).  At the 1978 World Championships in Berlin, she and her Canadian teammates won a bronze medal in the 4x100-metre freestyle relay.

In 2014, Sloan was inducted into the Alberta Sports Hall of Fame.

See also
 List of Olympic medalists in swimming (women)

References 

1958 births
Living people
Canadian female butterfly swimmers
Canadian female freestyle swimmers
Olympic bronze medalists for Canada
Olympic bronze medalists in swimming
Olympic swimmers of Canada
Sportspeople from Alberta
Swimmers at the 1976 Summer Olympics
Swimmers at the 1979 Pan American Games
World Aquatics Championships medalists in swimming
Medalists at the 1976 Summer Olympics
Commonwealth Games medallists in swimming
Commonwealth Games gold medallists for Canada
Swimmers at the 1978 Commonwealth Games
Pan American Games competitors for Canada
20th-century Canadian women
Medallists at the 1978 Commonwealth Games